The 2011–12 Pittsburgh Panthers men's basketball team represented the University of Pittsburgh in the 2011–12 NCAA Division I men's basketball season. Their head coach was Jamie Dixon, who was in his ninth year as head coach at Pittsburgh and 13th overall at the University. The team played its home games in the Petersen Events Center in Pittsburgh, Pennsylvania and are members of the Big East Conference. Pitt entered the 2011–12 season picked to finish fourth in the Big East Conference, ranked #11 in the pre-season ESPN/USA Today Coaches Poll, and with the Big East pre-season player of the year, Ashton Gibbs. They finished the season 22–17, 5–13 in Big East play for a disappointing 13th-place finish. They lost in the second round of the Big East Basketball tournament to Georgetown. They were invited to the 2012 College Basketball Invitational where they advanced to the best of three game finals series against Washington State. They defeated the Cougars 2 games to 1 to be the 2012 CBI Champions.

Outlook 
The  Pittsburgh Panthers finished the 2010–11 season as Big East Regular Season champions with 28–6, 15–3.  They received a number 1 seed in the 2011 NCAA Division I men's basketball tournament, but were upset by eventual national runner-up Butler in the third round. Finishing at No. 12 in the final Coaches' Poll, Pitt returns two starters, including 2011–12 Big East Pre-season Player of the Year, Ashton Gibbs, as well as two of its top four scores, 41% of its scoring, and 45% of its rebounding. Four freshman joint the team, including McDonald's High School All-American Khem Birch.

At the Big East Conference media day on October 19, 2011, Pitt was selected by a vote of the league's coaches to finish fourth in the Big East Conference receiving one first place votes. Pitt guard Ashton Gibbs received preseason Player of the Year and first-team all-conference selections.  The Panthers are ranked 11th in the nation in the preseason USA Today Coaches' Poll.

Coaching staff

Recruiting 
2011 Pitt Recruiting Class Signees.

Roster 
2011–12 Pitt Panthers basketball roster

 Note: Freshman Khem Birch (#24, 6 ft 9 in, 220 lb), at the time Pitt's starting center, left the team on December 16.

Schedule 
Pitt's 2011–12 schedule.

|-
!colspan=12 style="background:#091C44; color:#CEC499;" | Scrimmage

|-
!colspan=12 style="background:#091C44; color:#CEC499;" | Exhibition

|-
!colspan=12 style="background:#091C44; color:#CEC499;" | Regular season

|-
!colspan=12 style="background:#091C44; color:#CEC499;" | Big East Regular Season

|-
!colspan=12 style="background:#091C44; color:#CEC499;" | 2012 Big East tournament

|-

|-
|-
!colspan=12 style="background:#091C44; color:#CEC499;" | 2012 College Basketball Invitational

|-

|-

|-

|-

Rankings

Season notes and accomplishments
 Pitt won the 2011 Philly Hoops Group Classic title with a perfect 4-0 record.
 Pitt lost to 2 unranked non-conference teams (Long Beach State and Wagner) at home, for the 1st time in one season. They only had one previous home non-conference loss at the Peterson Events Center.
 Freshman Khem Birch, at the time Pitt's starting center, left the team on December 16.
 Starting point guard Tray Woodall suffered a groin/abdominal injury during the Duquesne game on November 30 and did not return until the Notre Dame game on Tuesday, December 27. During the Notre Dame game he reaggravated his injury and did not reappear until the Louisville game on January 21.
 For the first time under head coach Jamie Dixon, the Pitt basketball team lost over three games in a row, eventually losing a total of eight straight games, its longest losing streak in 18 years. Also, for first time ever, Pitt opened its Big East Conference season with seven straight loses.
 After averaging 26.5 points, 5.0 rebounds, and 4.0 assists in wins over West Virginia and Villanova, point guard Tray Woodall was named the Oscar Robertson National Player of the Week on February 7, 2012 by the United States Basketball Writers Association.

References

Pittsburgh Panthers
Pittsburgh Panthers men's basketball seasons
Pittsburgh Panthers
College Basketball Invitational championship seasons
Pittsburgh Pan
Pittsburgh Pan